The Upper Rockville Mill is an historic mill complex at 332 Canonchet Road in Hopkinton, Rhode Island. The two buildings are the main mill building, a 3-1/2 story stone structure built 1844–45, and a two-story auxiliary building added in the 1860s. The Rockville Manufacturing Company, which operated the mill, was a major employer and landowner in the area for much of the 19th century. The property was operated by a variety of textile concerns until 1953, when the property was briefly owned by the Boy Scouts of America (BSA), whose Camp Yawgoog, located on the shores of Wincheck and Yawgoog Ponds, was affected by the mill's water rights. The BSA retained the water rights and sold off the rest of the property.

The mill complex was listed on the National Register of Historic Places in 2006.

See also
National Register of Historic Places listings in Washington County, Rhode Island

References

Industrial buildings completed in 1844
Industrial buildings and structures on the National Register of Historic Places in Rhode Island
Buildings and structures in Washington County, Rhode Island
Hopkinton, Rhode Island
National Register of Historic Places in Washington County, Rhode Island
1844 establishments in Rhode Island